Jack Reed is a series of popular made for TV crime drama films fictionalizing the career of real-life Cook County Sheriff's Homicide Investigator Jack Reed.  The first film, Deadly Matrimony, a two-part drama based on the Barbara Schaaf non-fiction book about the Dianne Masters murder case, Shattered Hopes, was first broadcast in 1992.  It was written by Andrew Laskos, directed by John Korty, and starred Brian Dennehy as Reed.

Deadly Matrimony was well-enough received that it was followed, the next year by Badge of Honor, also written by Laskos, and directed by Kevin Connor.  Dennehy, who had pushed to get more films based on Reed's career made, was the co-executive producer.

Further sequels, also starring Dennehy, were also all directed by him.

All the films were loosely based on cases Reed had investigated during his police career.

In the films, Reed was depicted as a sergeant.  In real life, by the time the films were being broadcast, Reed was a lieutenant, in charge of the Sheriff's cold case detail.  When he retired from the Sheriff's Police after thirty-five years, he entered private security.

The series includes the TV films:
1992:  Deadly Matrimony directed by John Korty
1993: Jack Reed: Badge of Honor directed by Kevin Connor
1994: Jack Reed: A Search for Justice directed by Brian Dennehy
1995: Jack Reed: One of Our Own directed by Brian Dennehy
1996: Jack Reed: A Killer Among Us directed by Brian Dennehy
1996: Jack Reed: Death and Vengeance directed by Brian Dennehy

American crime drama films
American drama television films